The North and South Railroad of Georgia was chartered in 1870 to build a  narrow gauge railroad from Columbus to Rome, Georgia.

Predecessors of the Central of Georgia Railway
Defunct Georgia (U.S. state) railroads
Railway companies established in 1870
Railway companies disestablished in 1878
Narrow gauge railroads in Georgia (U.S. state)
3 ft gauge railways in the United States